Lanphear Buck (born December 9, 1901, Fall River, Massachusetts; died May 18, 1974, Port Chester, New York) was an American field hockey player who competed in the 1936 Summer Olympics.

He was born in Fall River, Massachusetts to Augustus Walker Buck and Jennie Hurd (Lanphear) Buck.  On September 16, 1937 he married Arizona-born Louise McArthur in Philadelphia, Pennsylvania.

In 1936 he was a member of the American team which was eliminated in the group stage of the Olympic tournament. He played one match as forward.

Back later became a real estate management executive.

References

External links
 
profile

1901 births
American male field hockey players
Olympic field hockey players of the United States
Field hockey players at the 1936 Summer Olympics
1974 deaths